Raike  is a village and Union council of  Phalia Tehsil, Mandi Bahauddin District, Punjab, Pakistan.

Overview

Geography
It is located with an altitude of 205 metres above from sea level Location of Dhaul Ranjha - Falling Rain Genomics and lies about 8 km in west of Phalia on the Gujrat-Phalia Road. The nearest police station is Phalia Police Station, which is in Phalia city.

Education
There is a Government-run Primary and Middle schools for both boys and girls. Also there are private schools as well. The literacy rate is increasing sharply.
Government Middle School for Boys
Government Middle School for Girls

Community
Population of village is round about 4000. Most of the population are farmers by profession in this village. Muhammad Tariq Tarar Member of National Assembly of Pakistan & Parliamentary Secretary for Information and Broadcasting is also belongs from this village.

References

Villages in Phalia Tehsil
Villages in Mandi Bahauddin District
Union councils of Mandi Bahauddin District